The Orinoco saltator or Orinocan saltator (Saltator orenocensis) is a species of saltator in the family Thraupidae.
It is found in Venezuela in areas west, north, and upon the Orinoco River region and to the Caribbean coast; also border regions in adjacent northeast Colombia. It can also be found on the eastern shore of Lake Maracaibo.
Its natural habitats are subtropical or tropical dry forests, subtropical or tropical moist lowland forests, and subtropical or tropical dry shrubland.

References

External links
 Orinocan Saltator videos on the Internet Bird Collection
 Orinocan Saltator photo gallery VIREO Photo-High Res--(Close-up)
 Photo-High Res; Article pbase–"Eastern Venezuela"

Orinoco saltator
Birds of Venezuela
Orinoco saltator
Taxonomy articles created by Polbot